Storeton is a village in Wirral, Merseyside, England.  It contains two buildings that are recorded in the National Heritage List for England as designated listed buildings.   Of these, one is listed at Grade II*, the middle of the three grades, and the other is at Grade II, the lowest grade.  The former was a medieval that has been converted into farm buildings, and the other is a pair of stone houses.

Key

Buildings

See also

 Grade I listed buildings in Merseyside
 Grade II* listed buildings in Merseyside

References
Citations

Sources

Listed buildings in Merseyside
Lists of listed buildings in Merseyside